Crystal Rock is an unincorporated community and census-designated place in Erie County, Ohio, United States. As of the 2010 census it had a population of 176. It is located within Margaretta Township.

Geography
Crystal Rock is located in western Erie County, in the northwestern part of Margaretta Township, on the south shore of Sandusky Bay, an arm of Lake Erie.

Demographics

References

Geography of Erie County, Ohio
Census-designated places in Ohio
Ohio populated places on Lake Erie
Census-designated places in Erie County, Ohio